The 2017 Northeast Conference men's basketball tournament is the postseason men's basketball tournament for the Northeast Conference. The tournament is being held from March 1–7, 2017. All games of the tournament took place on campus sites hosted by the higher-seeded school. The winner, Mount St. Mary's, earned the conference's automatic bid to the 2017 NCAA tournament with a 71-61 win over St. Francis (PA) in the finals.

Seeds
For the 13th straight year, the NEC Men’s Basketball Tournament consists of an eight-team playoff format with all games played at the home of the higher seed. After the quarterfinals, the teams will be reseeded so the highest remaining seed plays the lowest remaining seed in the semifinals.

The teams were seeded by record in conference, with a tiebreaker system to seed teams with identical conference records.

Schedule

Bracket
Teams will be reseeded after each round with highest remaining seeds receiving home court advantage.

All games will be played at the venue of the higher seed

All-tournament team
Tournament MVP in bold.

References

Northeast Conference men's basketball tournament
Tournament
Northeast Conference men's basketball tournament